Bossier City is a city in Bossier Parish in the northwestern region of the U.S. state of Louisiana in the United States. It is the second-most populous city in the Shreveport–Bossier City metropolitan statistical area. In 2020, it had a total population of 62,701, up from 61,315 in 2010.

Located on the eastern bank of the Red River, Bossier City is closely tied economically and socially to its larger sister city Shreveport on the opposite bank, though the city maintains its own community college (Bossier Parish Community College). Bossier City is the largest city in Louisiana that is not the parish seat.

History

19th century
In the 1830s, the area of Bossier City was the plantation Elysian Grove, which was purchased by James Cane and his second wife Mary Doal Cilley Bennett Cane. James had come to the area with his first wife Rebecca Bennett, and her brother, William Bennett, and his wife Mary Doal Cilley Bennett. They ran a trading post across the river on what was then Caddo Indian territory, a portion called "Bennett's Bluff". The trading post partners became a one-seventh partner in the new Shreve Town, which eventually developed as Shreveport.

Elysian Grove plantation was located along the Red River for access to transportation, where the Texas Trail crossed the Red River. The trading post on the west side operated a ferry between what would become Shreveport and Bossier City. The plantation loading and unloading dock was later recorded as Cane's Landing in the old ferry log books. For a very short time, Cane's Landing was known as Cane City. The Canes and Bennetts were among the earliest settlers in the area. Mary D. C. Bennett gave birth to the first white baby of the area, William Smith Bennett Jr., who died at an early age.

In 1843, a section of land east of the Red River was divided from the Great Natchitoches District and Claiborne Parish areas and was called Bossier Parish. It was named in honor of Pierre Evariste John Baptiste Bossier, a former Creole general, who became a cotton planter in Bossier Parish. He was one of the first European settlers in the area.

In the 1840s, the Great Western Migration of Americans and immigrants began, and the parish grew in population. Many early settlers passed through the region on their way to the Western U.S. By 1850, more than 200 wagons a week passed through Bossier City, many intending to settle in Texas. Some of these settlers stayed in Louisiana, attracted by the fertile soil and river valley. In 1850, the U.S. census listed the population at 6,962.

American Civil War
During the American Civil War, companies of Confederate soldiers shipped out of Cane's Landing aboard steamboats for distant battlefields. Mrs. Cane hosted hundreds of Confederate officers and troops who were heading off to war. Mrs. Cane's plantation was fortified to protect Shreveport by three batteries, with Fort Kirby Smith in the center. The others were Batteries Price, and Walker and Ewell.

Fort Smith protected the area from an eastern invasion. The American Civil War reached Bossier Parish in 1861, and ended in Shreveport four years later, when the Trans-Mississippi Department surrendered. In the 20th century, Bossier High School was constructed near the former site of the fort.

Shed Road
Shed Road, the first all-weather turnpike in the American South, was constructed in the 1870s and operated from 1874 to 1886. A plantation was at the end of the elevated and covered roadway, which was accessible by a ferry boat. The covered road made the transportation of goods easier before the arrival of the railroads.

Classification as a city
Anna B., granddaughter of James and Mary Cane, felt the area would prosper and began promoting the idea of a riverfront city. Anna B. and J. J. Stockwell sold lots in 1883. The area grew quickly, as did transportation through it. At the time, the unincorporated settlement was often called Cane City. Around 1907, Cane City was incorporated by former Louisiana Governor Newton C. Blanchard and renamed the village of Bossier City. Blanchard named a Shreveport businessman, Ewald Max Hoyer, as the first Bossier City mayor. Continued growth led to Bossier City's being redesignated from village to town by Governor John M. Parker. Later, Governor Earl Kemp Long issued a proclamation classifying Bossier City as a city.

The "golden spike" commemorated the completion of the east–west Vicksburg, Shreveport and Pacific Railroad. It was driven at Bossier City on July 12, 1884, by Julia "Pansy" Rule. It was the first such spike to be driven by a woman. The north–south Shreveport and Arkansas Railroad was completed on April 6, 1888. The Louisiana–Arkansas Railroad was completed on November 2, 1909. The Dixie Overland Highway from the East to the West Coast was built in 1918. These railroads and highways combined to make Bossier City a hub for future activity.

The discovery of crude oil, to the south, in 1908, thrust Bossier City into the nationwide oil boom. Bossier's central location to the rural oil fields made it a major player in the oil patch. Several international oil companies were located in the area. The advantages brought by black gold fueled many civic, social and economic improvements.

A fire on June 23, 1925, consumed one-half of downtown Bossier City. Local citizens were unable to battle the blaze. The loss spurred civic improvements, including a modern water system capable of fighting such fires, a new city hall, a modern fire alarm system, modern sidewalks, and the first city park.

In the 1930s, construction began on Barksdale Airfield (now Barksdale Air Force Base). The land on which the base is built was unincorporated property south of Bossier City in 1929. This land was annexed by the city of Shreveport and donated to the federal government. Through the years, Bossier City expanded, eventually encompassing the area surrounding the base. The first unit assigned to Barksdale was the 20th Pursuit Group. Before World War II, Barksdale was a training school for the Army Air Corps. During World War II, Barksdale trained pilots, navigators, and bombardiers. Later, the base became one of the key bases of the Strategic Air Command in the new Air Force. Barksdale is the headquarters for the 8th Air Force.

In the 1890s, Cane City had a population of about 600. Bossier City in 2012 had an estimated population of over 64,000. First a cotton-exporting river landing, next a railroad town, then an airbase and oil-boom town, Bossier City has become known for its tourism and casino gambling.

Three casinos in the city have financed a number of municipal projects, many completed during the administration of the late Mayor George Dement. Recent improvements include the CenturyLink Center, Louisiana Boardwalk, Benton Road Overpass, and the Arthur Ray Teague Parkway, located along the eastern side of the Red River. Dement also procured Amtrak service between Bossier City and Dallas, Texas. Dement was succeeded as mayor in 2005 by his administrative assistant and former mayoral opponent from 1989, Lo Walker, the first Republican to hold the city's top executive position.

Growth and redevelopment 
On April 20, 2017, in their joint "State of Bossier" address, hosted by the Bossier Chamber of Commerce, Mayor Lo Walker, and Bossier Parish Police Jury President Bob Brotherton described the growth of the city and parish as "outstanding." With a population of 69,000 in a 2015 study by Louisiana State University, Bossier City had become the sixth-largest city in the state and the fastest-growing one.

Walker said that the city and the parish "work extremely close together, and our business and civic leaders and military make us an outstanding parish." The parish grew at 19%; the city grew at 10%. According to the Bossier Economic Development Foundation, the city could have reached 80,000 by 2019. Ongoing projects contributing to growth include the Walter O. Bigby Carriageway (the north parkway extension named for former state representative and judge Walter O. Bigby), Shed Road construction, and the South Bossier redevelopment districts.

Geography
The city lies primarily on the banks of the Red River, and has a largely flat topography in contrast with Shreveport's terrain. The northern city limits are noticeably more hilly than the rest of the city. Many small waterways flow through the city, such as Flat River and Red Chute Bayou, which provide drainage for many areas of the city.

Climate 
Bossier shares most aspects of its climate with its sister city of Shreveport. The city has a humid subtropical climate (Köppen climate classification Cfa) with hot, humid summers and mild winters.

During the warmer months, the city is prone to severe thunderstorms that feature heavy rain, high winds, hail, and occasional tornadoes. The city has a slightly above-average rate of tornadoes when compared to the U.S. average. Due to the flat topography of the city and the prominence of smaller waterways that are prone to backwater flooding from the Red River, the city occasionally experiences severe flooding events. A notable occurrence of severe flooding occurred in March 2016 after torrential rains caused a rapid rise of many local waterways, displacing upwards of 3,500 people from their homes across the area. Freezes and ice storms regularly occur during the winters.

Demographics

Per the 2020 United States census, 62,701 people, 26,677 households, and 17,524 families resided in the city. According to 2019 census estimates per the American Community Survey, 24.2% of the population were 18 and older, and 13.8% were  65 and older; the 26,927 households from 2015 to 2019 had an average of 2.44 people per household. In 1890, Bossier City initially had a population of 202, which has steadily increased since.

In 2019, the racial and ethnic makeup of the city was 58.5% non-Hispanic or Latino white, 27.9% Black or African American, 0.4% Native American, 2.4% Asian, 0.1% Native Hawaiian and other Pacific Islander, 2.5% two or more races, and 8.6% Hispanic and Latino American of any race. At the 2020 census, the racial and ethnic makeup of the city was 50.79% non-Hispanic white, 30.45% Black or African American, 0.38% Native American, 2.36% Asian, 0.12% Pacific Islander, 5.22% two or more races, and 10.68% Hispanic and Latino American of any race; the 2020 census reflected nationwide trends of greater diversification and the growth of traditional minority populations in areas once predominantly non-Hispanic white.

Of the 26,927 households estimated at 2019's American Community Survey, the owner-occupied housing rate was 52.8% and the median value of an owner-occupied housing unit was $163,500. The median cost with a mortgage was $1,182 versus $363 without a mortgage, and the median gross rent was $955. The median income for a household in the city was $50,340, and the per capita income was $26,755; an estimated 19.7% of the population lived at or below the poverty line. By 2020, its median household income was $48,385 with a mean income of $63,114.

Religion 
The majority of Bossier City's population is Christian, and neighboring Shreveport is more religiously diverse than Bossier. Of its population, 37.9% identified as Baptists, primary affiliated with the Southern Baptist Convention and National Baptist Convention, USA, Inc. Within the city, 6.7% were Methodists primarily served by the United Methodist Church, 5.2% were Catholics in the Shreveport Diocese, 2.2% Pentecostal, 0.9% Latter Day Saints, 0.4% Presbyterian, 0.4% Lutheran, and 0.2% Episcopalian or Anglican. Within the Christian population of Bossier City, 7.7% claimed to be from another Christian group. Outside of Christendom, 0.3% of the city's residents were adherents to Islam. Less than 0.1% of Bossier's residents identified with Judaism or eastern religions such as Hinduism or Buddhism.

Education

Bossier City residents are zoned to Bossier Parish Schools. Public schools in the area are:

Elementary schools
 Apollo Elementary School
 Bellaire Elementary School
 Benton Elementary School
 Bossier Elementary School
 Carrie Martin Elementary School
 Central Park Elementary School
 Curtis Elementary School
 Elm Grove Elementary School
 Kingston Elementary School
 Legacy Elementary School
 Meadowview Elementary School
 Plantation Park Elementary School
 Platt Elementary School
 Princeton Elementary School
 T. L. Rhodes Elementary School
 R.V. Kerr Elementary School
 Stockwell Place Elementary School
 Sun City Elementary School
 W.T. Lewis Elementary School
 Waller Elementary School

Middle schools
 Benton Intermediate School
 Benton Middle School
 Cope Middle School
 Elm Grove Middle School
 Greenacres Middle School
 Haughton Middle School
 Plain Dealing Middle/High School
 T.O. Rusheon Middle School

High schools
 Airline High School
 Benton High School
 Bossier High School
 Haughton High School
 Parkway High School
 Plain Dealing High/Middle School

Community colleges
 Bossier Parish Community College

Universities
 Louisiana Tech University at Shreveport-Bossier City

Media
As a sister city to Shreveport, the city of Bossier City is served by the Bossier Press-Tribune and Shreveport Times. In addition, The Forum, City Lights, and SB Magazine are news magazines in the Shreveport–Bossier City area. The city shares the same television and radio markets with Shreveport and the Texarkana metropolitan area as part of the Ark-La-Tex.

In mainstream media, "Bossier City" is a song by David Allan Coe, in which he sings, "And it sure smells like snow in Bossier City..." Johnny Rodriguez recorded a song called "Achin' Bossier City Backyard Blues" in 1972. Turnpike Troubadours 2007 freshman album is entitled Bossier City, and includes the title track "Bossier City".

Radio

AM radio

FM radio

Sports and entertainment

From the 1930s to the 1970s, Bossier was regionally and even nationally known for its entertainment district known as The Bossier Strip, which followed U.S. Highway 80 through the city. Nightclubs proliferated from the Texas Avenue Bridge to the Bossier-Webster parish line. Prior to the 1940s, The Strip was as well known for such entertainment as Las Vegas, Nevada.

Bossier City and Shreveport share an all-women's flat track roller derby team named the Twin City Knockers. The team is the newest competing sport in the area, founded in January 2010. Bouts are hosted at Hot Wheels skating rink in south Bossier.

The Brookshires Grocery Arena (formerly CenturyTel Center) in Bossier City was the home of the Bossier–Shreveport Battle Wings of the AF2, as well as the Bossier-Shreveport Mudbugs of the Central Hockey League. The arena has hosted top performers, including Britney Spears and Aerosmith, as well as rodeos, ice shows, and children's entertainment.

The 2005 Red River Classic PRCA Rodeo to be hosted at the CenturyTel Center was cancelled due to the arena's use as a shelter for Hurricane Katrina evacuees.

The city hosts three riverboat casino gambling resorts along the east bank of the Red River: Margaritaville, Horseshoe, and Boomtown. Diamond Jacks previously operated in the area before closing, but Foundation Gaming has plans for reopening in 2024. Horse racing and gambling on slot machines is also available at Louisiana Downs, which opened in 1974.

Notable people

 Sherry Boucher, former Hollywood actress and realtor in Bossier Parish
 Jimmy Boyd, state representative for Bossier Parish from 1944 to 1952
 Henry Newton Brown Jr., judge of the Louisiana Second Circuit Court of Appeals (1992–2012) and district attorney of Bossier and Webster parishes (1976–1991), is a long-term resident of Bossier City.
 Jeff Cox, judge of Division C of the 26th Judicial District in Bossier and Webster parishes since 2005 
 Raymond Crews, Republican state representative for District 8
 Tim Dement, amateur boxer who competed in the 1972 Summer Olympics, former Bossier City police detective, and son of former Mayor George Dement
 Ryan Gatti, state senator for District 36, 2016–2020; Bossier City lawyer
 Eurlyne Howell, Miss Louisiana USA 1958, Miss USA 1958
 Mike Johnson, Republican U.S. Representative since 2017 for Louisiana's 4th congressional district; former state representative
 
 Keith Lehr, two-time World Series of Poker bracelet winner, born and resides in Bossier City
 Jared Leto, actor and musician, was born in Bossier City on December 26, 1971.
 Shannon Leto, drummer of 30 Seconds to Mars and older brother of Jared Leto, was born in Bossier City on March 9, 1970.

 Judi Ann Mason, born and reared in Shreveport-Bossier, Hollywood screenwriter and producer, wrote Sister Act 2: Back in the Habit
 John McConathy (1930–2016), professional basketball player, former superintendent for the Bossier Parish School Board
 Mike McConathy (born 1955), basketball coach at Northwestern State University in Natchitoches since 1999; former basketball coach at Bossier Parish Community College; son of John McConathy
 Alex Pourteau, professional wrestler who worked for both WWE and WCW, was born in Bossier City in 1969.
 Buddy Roemer, former United States Representative from Louisiana's 4th Congressional District (1980–87) and Governor of Louisiana (1988–92)
 Charles E. Roemer II, farmer, businessman, and politician
 B. J. Ryan was a closer in Major League Baseball for the Toronto Blue Jays of the American League. Previously, Ryan played for the Cincinnati Reds and Baltimore Orioles (1999–).
 Jeffrey D. Sadow, political scientist, columnist, professor at Louisiana State University in Shreveport
 Jeff R. Thompson, state representative; successor to Jane Smith
 David Toms, a professional golfer, graduated from Airline High School.
 Randy Walker, a professional American football player who played for the Green Bay Packers in 1974, graduated from Bossier High School and later Northwestern State University.  Walker still holds many punting/kicking records at both schools.
 Todd Walker, a professional baseball player, graduated from Airline High School.
 Jesse Winchester, musician and songwriter, was born May 17, 1944, at Barksdale Air Force Base.

References

External links

 

 
Cities in Louisiana
Geography of Shreveport, Louisiana
Populated places established in 1907
Cities in Bossier Parish, Louisiana
Cities in Shreveport – Bossier City metropolitan area
Cities in the Ark-La-Tex
Cities in North Louisiana